Əhmədli is a village in the Lachin District of Azerbaijan.

History 
The village was located in the Armenian-occupied territories surrounding Nagorno-Karabakh, coming under the control of ethnic Armenian forces during the First Nagorno-Karabakh War in the early 1990s. The village subsequently became part of the breakaway Republic of Artsakh as part of its Kashatagh Province, where it was known as Herik. It was returned to Azerbaijan as part of the 2020 Nagorno-Karabakh ceasefire agreement.

Historical heritage sites 
Historical heritage sites in and around the village include the 17th-century St. George's Church.

Notable people 
 Nazim Ahmedli (born 1953), the Director of the Literary Literature Affiliate Bureau of the Union of Azerbaijani Writers.

References

External links 
 

Villages in Azerbaijan
Populated places in Lachin District